Pirojpur-3 is a constituency represented in the Jatiya Sangsad (National Parliament) of Bangladesh since 2014 by Rustum Ali Faraji, of the Jatiya Party (Ershad) since 2018.

Boundaries 
The constituency encompasses Mathbaria Upazila.

History 
The constituency was created in 1984 from a Bakerganj constituency when the former Bakerganj District was split into four districts: Bhola, Bakerganj, Jhalokati, and Pirojpur.

Ahead of the 2008 general election, the Election Commission redrew constituency boundaries to reflect population changes revealed by the 2001 Bangladesh census. The 2008 redistricting altered the boundaries of the constituency.

Ahead of the 2014 general election, the Election Commission reduced the boundaries of the constituency. Previously it had also included one union parishad of Bhandaria Upazila: Telikhali.

Members of Parliament

Elections

Elections in the 2010s

Elections in the 2000s

Elections in the 1990s

References

External links
 

Parliamentary constituencies in Bangladesh
Pirojpur District